Oil Blue A is a blue anthraquinone dye used for colouring certain plastics such as polystyrene and acrylic resins, as well as other materials such as petroleum and inks. It has good resistance to light.

See also
 Oil Blue 35

Reflist

Solvent dyes
Anthraquinone dyes
Aromatic amines